Karagas language may refer to:

 Karagas, another name for the Turkic Tofa language
 Karagas, a dialect of the Uralic Mator language

See also 
 Karaga (disambiguation)